Eugene Edgerson (born February 10, 1978 in New Orleans, Louisiana) is an American basketball player who used to play for the Harlem Globetrotters. As is tradition with the Globetrotters, Edgerson has a nickname: "Wildkat", presumably in honor of his alma mater, the University of Arizona.

Edgerson spent 1996–2001 as a member of the Arizona Wildcats men's basketball team. He played on a pair of Final Four teams (1997, 2001) with the Wildcats and was a member of the UA 1997 National Championship squad.  He is a member of Phi Beta Sigma fraternity. He appeared as a Globetrotter on the ESPN2 program Cold Pizza on March 1, 2007.

2009 Edgerson was arrested on suspicion of domestic violence assault and domestic violence disorderly conduct and booked into the Pima County Jail, according to authorities. He also was arrested, earlier in the year, on February 18 after his wife claimed he pulled her hair during a dispute.

During his career at Arizona, Edgerson took a one-year hiatus from competitive basketball to fulfill student-teaching duties at a Tucson kindergarten.
He was a detention officer and joined the police.

Notes

1978 births
Living people
Arizona Wildcats men's basketball players
Basketball players from New Orleans
Harlem Globetrotters players
Mobile Revelers players
St. Augustine High School (New Orleans) alumni
American men's basketball players